Charles Lowe   was a professional baseball player who played second base for the  Brooklyn Atlantics team of the NAPBBP. He played in seven games for the Atlantics during the season.

References

External links

19th-century baseball players
Brooklyn Atlantics players